The 2023 season is scheduled to be the Memphis Showboats inaugural season in the United States Football League, their first at Simmons Bank Liberty Stadium, and their first under head coach/general manager tandem of Todd Haley and Dave Razzano.

Offseason

Stadium Plans 
Shortly before the completion of the 2022 season, the USFL announced plans to move into two or four hubs for teams to play in. In November, the USFL was reportedly exploring options of having a hub in Metro Detroit, with possible locations being the Eastern Michigan Eagles' Rynearson Stadium and the Detroit Lions' Ford Field.

When it was announced that the Showboats would be added to the USFL to take the place of the former Tampa Bay Bandits, it was announced that Memphis would be one of the hub cities for the 2023 season. They will share their hub with the Houston Gamblers.

Draft 
The Showboats clinched the 4th pick in the 2023 USFL Draft and hold the fourth pick in each round.

Personnel

Roster 
The Showboats, like all other teams, have a 38-man active roster with a 7-man practice squad.

Staff

Schedule

Regular Season

Standings

References

Memphis
Memphis Showboats
Memphis Showboats (2022)